Olander Nunatak is one of several somewhat scattered nunataks which rise above the ice of eastern Palmer Land, lying 5 nautical miles (9 km) east of Tollefson Nunatak and 27 nautical miles (50 km) north-northwest of Sky-Hi Nunataks. Mapped by United States Geological Survey (USGS) from surveys and U.S. Navy air photos, 1961–67. Named by Advisory Committee on Antarctic Names (US-ACAN) for R.E. Olander, electronics technician at Eights Station in 1963.

Nunataks of Palmer Land